Thinkin' About You is the fifth studio album by American country music singer Trisha Yearwood. The album reached #3 on the Billboard country albums chart.

This album produced back-to-back Number One hits for Yearwood on the Billboard country charts in "XXX's and OOO's (An American Girl)" and "Thinkin' About You". Following these songs were "You Can Sleep While I Drive" (#23), "I Wanna Go Too Far" (#9), and "On a Bus to St. Cloud" (#59). "On a Bus to St. Cloud" was also the first single of Yearwood's career to miss Top 40 on the country charts. It was nominated for Best Country Album at the 38th Grammy Awards.

Critical reception

AllMusic gave the album a mediocre review, calling the arrangements "too slick," and noting that it was one of Yearwood's few albums that could be considered a disappointment.

Track listing
"Thinkin' About You" (Bob Regan, Tom Shapiro) – 3:23
"XXX's and OOO's (An American Girl)" (Matraca Berg, Alice Randall) – 2:47
"You Can Sleep While I Drive" (Melissa Etheridge) – 3:15
"The Restless Kind" (Mike Henderson) – 3:27
"On a Bus to St. Cloud" (Gretchen Peters) – 4:43
"Fairytale" (Tony Arata) – 3:35
"Those Words We Said" (Angelo Petraglia, Kim Richey) – 3:03
"O Mexico" (Michael Joyce, Irene Kelley) – 3:36
"I Wanna Go Too Far" (Layng Martine Jr., Kent Robbins) – 2:59
"Till I Get It Right" (Larry Henley, Red Lane) – 4:04

International track listing
"Thinkin' About You" (Bob Regan, Tom Shapiro) – 3:23
"XXX's and OOO's (An American Girl)" (Matraca Berg, Alice Randall) – 2:47
"You Can Sleep While I Drive" (Melissa Etheridge) – 3:15
"The Restless Kind" (Mike Henderson) – 3:27
"Two Days from Knowing" (Gillian Welch, Matt Rollings) – 3:43
"On a Bus to St. Cloud" (Gretchen Peters) – 4:43
"Fairytale" (Tony Arata) – 3:35
"Those Words We Said" (Angelo Petraglia, Kim Richey) – 3:03
"O Mexico" (Michael Joyce, Irene Kelley) – 3:36
"Jackie's House" (Chapin Hartford) – 4:19
"I Wanna Go Too Far" (Layng Martine, Jr., Kent Robbins) – 2:59
"Bartender Blues" (James Taylor) – 3:51
duet with George Jones
"Till I Get It Right" (Larry Henley, Red Lane) – 4:04
"'Save The Land - 3:50 [Australian Version Bonus Track]

Personnel 
 Trisha Yearwood – lead vocals, backing vocals (3)
 Matt Rollings – acoustic piano (1, 3, 5, 6, 7, 10, 11, 13), organ (1, 8, 9)
 Steve Nathan – organ (2, 3, 4), keyboards (3, 10)
 Billy Joe Walker, Jr. – acoustic guitar (1, 2, 3, 5–11, 13)
 Bobby All – acoustic guitar (4)
 Jon Randall – acoustic guitar (5, 8)
 Brian Ahern – acoustic guitar (12)
 Brent Mason — electric guitar (1–11, 13)
 Lee Roy Parnell — electric slide guitar (1, 3, 11)
 Mike Henderson – electric guitar (4)
 Billy Sanford – electric guitar (5), acoustic guitar (13), "tremelo" electric guitar (13)
 Paul Franklin — steel guitar (1–8, 10, 11, 13)
 Jerry Douglas – dobro (9)
 Sam Bush – mandolin (9)
 Marty Stuart – mandolin (12)
 Dave Pomeroy — bass guitar (1–11, 13)
 Glenn Worf – acoustic bass (12)
 Eddie Bayers – drums 
 Tom Roady – congas (1, 7), tambourine (1, 8, 11), bongos (7)
 Aubrey Haynie – fiddle (1, 3–11, 13)
 Rob Hajacos – fiddle (2)
 Ricky Skaggs – fiddle (12)
 Kirk "Jelly Roll" Johnson — harmonica (3, 7, 10)
 Mark Watters – string arrangements and conductor (6, 10, 13)
 Carl Gorodetzky – string contractor (6, 10, 13)
 The Nashville String Machine – strings (6, 10, 13)
 Chuck Cannon – backing vocals (1)
 Lari White – backing vocals (1)
 Kim Richey – backing vocals (2)
 Harry Stinson – backing vocals (2, 4)
 Gretchen Peters – backing vocals (6)
 Mac McAnally – backing vocals (7, 11), acoustic guitar (12)
  Andrea Zonn – backing vocals (7, 11)
 Raul Malo – backing vocals (8)
 Mary Chapin Carpenter – backing vocals (9)
 Pam Tillis – backing vocals (10)
 George Jones – lead vocals (12)

Production 
 Garth Fundis – producer (1–11, 13)
 Harry Stinson – co-producer (2)
 Brian Ahern – producer (12)
 Dave Sinko – engineer 
 Ken Hutton – assistant engineer
 Chuck Ainlay — mixing
 Amy Hughes – mix assistant
 Graham Lewis – mix assistant
 Carlos Grier – digital editing
 Denny Purcell – mastering
 Georgetown Masters (Nashville, Tennessee) – mastering location 
 Scott Paschall – production assistant 
 Beth Middleworth – art direction, design 
 Russ Harrington – photography

Charts

Weekly charts

Year-end charts

Singles

Certifications

References

MCA Records albums
Trisha Yearwood albums
1995 albums
Albums produced by Garth Fundis